Callan Chythlook-Sifsof (born February 14, 1989) is an American snowboarder who has competed in snowboard cross since 2005. In 2006, she was invited to her first Winter X Games competition and won a silver medal in 2011. She won the U.S. National Championships in Tamarack, Idaho in 2007. In 2008, she won the Jeep King of the Mountain World snowboard series in Sun Valley. Her best World Cup finishes were 2nd place in Furano, Japan in 2006 and 2nd place in Arosa, Switzerland in 2011.

It was announced on January 26, 2010, that Chythlook-Sifsof made the 2010 U.S. Winter Olympic Team. She placed 21st in the qualifying round of women's snowboard cross and did not advance.

In February 2014, during the 2014 Winter Olympics, in Sochi, Russia, for which she did not qualify, Chythlook-Sifsof came out publicly as gay, saying she did so in support of ongoing protests of Russia's anti-LGBTQ laws. She stated "it's important to come out and take a stand and show the world that it's not OK to be a bigot."

In 2022, U.S. Senator Chuck Grassley (R-Iowa) alleged that U.S. Ski & Snowboard had been interfering with a United States Center for SafeSport investigation into charges by three former American athletes and a former U.S. Ski & Snowboard employee against head coach Peter Foley, who coached the U.S. Snowboard team from 1994 to 2022. U.S. Ski & Snowboard President and CEO Sophie Goldschmidt pushed back on the claims the organization had interfered in the probe. After former snowboardcross Olympian Callan Chythlook-Sifsof accused Foley of sexually and racially inappropriate remarks in Instagram posts, and others accused Foley of sexual misconduct, he was temporarily suspended by SafeSport, and then dismissed by U.S. Ski & Snowboard. By August 2022, at least five women had made reports to SafeSport regarding Foley's behavior.

References

External links
  
 
 
 
 
 
 Callan Chythlook-Sifsof at U.S. Snowboarding
 

1989 births
American female snowboarders
Inupiat people
Lesbian sportswomen
LGBT Native Americans
LGBT people from Alaska
American LGBT sportspeople
LGBT snowboarders
Living people
Olympic snowboarders of the United States
People from Dillingham Census Area, Alaska
Snowboarders at the 2010 Winter Olympics
Sportspeople from Anchorage, Alaska
Yupik people
X Games athletes
2014 Winter Olympics
21st-century American LGBT people
21st-century American women
Native American sportswomen